This is a list of butterflies of Niue.

Pieridae

Coliadinae
Eurema hecabe sulphurata  (Butler, 1875)

Pierinae
Belenois java peristhene  (Boisduval, 1859)

Lycaenidae

Polyommatinae
Lampides boeticus (Linnaeus, 1767)
Famegana alsulus lulu  (Mathew, 1889) 
Zizina labradus mangoensis  (Butler, 1884)

Nymphalidae

Danainae
Euploea lewinii perryi  (Butler, 1874)

Nymphalinae
Hypolimnas antilope lutescens  (Butler, 1874) 
Hypolimnas bolina otaheitae  (C Felder, 1862)

References
W.John Tennent: A checklist of the butterflies of Melanesia, Micronesia, Polynesia and some adjacent areas. Zootaxa 1178: 1-209 (21 Apr. 2006)

 
Butterflies
Niue
Niue
Butterflies, Niue
Niue
Niue
Niue
Niue